Himmelblå (in English: Blue sky) was a Norwegian drama series that aired on NRK1 in Norway, on SVT in Sweden and on RÚV in Iceland. It is based on the British TV drama Two Thousand Acres of Sky written by Timothy Prager and produced by Adrian Bate.

Synopsis
Himmelblå is about a small community on Ylvingen, a remote island in northern Norway. The island's future is uncertain because the small school on the island will close unless they can find two additional pupils. The islanders place an advertisement in a national newspaper, promoting a family with two children old enough to join the school and promoting a job in the tourism industry if the family chooses to live on the island.

Marit (Line Verndal), a single mother living in Oslo, works late-nights as a chef and feels that she doesn't see her children often enough. Her best friend, Kim (Edward Schultheiss), helps her by looking after her children, Robin and Iris, while she is at work. When Kim shows Marit the advertisement, she sees an opportunity to start fresh and run her bed-and-breakfast on the island. Because the ad seeks a family to move to the island, Kim poses as Marit's "husband". After an interview, they receive an offer to stay on the island. The transition from urban life is challenging for the family, And their arrival is also a big change for the islanders.

Popularity
The first two seasons were filmed back-to-back in 168 days in 2007–2008. The show premiered on 7 September 2008, becoming an instant hit and averaging more than 1 million viewers. A few months later, it returned for a second season, whose finale was viewed by 1,309,000 viewers, making it the most-watched drama series in Norwegian television history. The third and final season finished filming in September 2009 and began airing on 7 March 2010. The final episode aired on 25 April 2010.

Cast

References

External links

Himmelblå's site at NRK
Ny sesong av Himmelblå (Norwegian)

NRK original programming
2008 Norwegian television series debuts
2010 Norwegian television series endings